Cainville (also Magnolia or Magnolia Station) is an unincorporated community located in the town of Magnolia, Rock County, Wisconsin, United States. The community was named for Seth J. Cain, an area promoter who donated land for the Chicago and North Western railroad station.

Notes

Unincorporated communities in Rock County, Wisconsin
Unincorporated communities in Wisconsin